Gloria E. Kemasuode Ubiebor (born 30 December 1979 in Delta State) is a female track and field sprint athlete, who competes internationally for Nigeria.

Kemasuode represented Nigeria at the 2008 Summer Olympics in Beijing, competing at the 4 x 100 metres relay together with Agnes Osazuwa, Oludamola Osayomi and Ene Franca Idoko. In their first round heat they placed fourth behind Belgium, Great Britain and Brazil. Their time of 43.43 seconds was the best non-directly qualifying time and the sixth time overall out of sixteen participating nations. With this result they qualified for the final, in which they replaced Osazuwa with Halimat Ismaila. They sprinted to a time of 43.04 seconds, a third place and a bronze medal after Russia and Belgium. In 2016, the Russian team was disqualified and stripped of their gold medal due to doping violations by one of the Russian runners, Yuliya Chermoshanskaya, thereby promoting Nigeria to the silver medal position.

Kemasuode failed a drugs test at the Circuito de Corridas e Caminhada in Brazil and was banned from competition for two years over the period of 24 July 2009 – 23 July 2011.

Achievements

Personal bests
60 metres - 7.48 s (2005)
100 metres - 11.21 s (2002)
200 metres - 23.26 s (2006)

See also
List of doping cases in sport

References

External links

1979 births
Living people
Nigerian female sprinters
Athletes (track and field) at the 2004 Summer Olympics
Athletes (track and field) at the 2008 Summer Olympics
Olympic athletes of Nigeria
Olympic silver medalists for Nigeria
Doping cases in athletics
Medalists at the 2008 Summer Olympics
Olympic silver medalists in athletics (track and field)
Athletes (track and field) at the 2007 All-Africa Games
African Games competitors for Nigeria
Olympic female sprinters
20th-century Nigerian women
21st-century Nigerian women